Gargar is a village in the Lori Province of Armenia, founded in 1790. 

After Lori was liberated from the Persian yoke by special decree and joined Tsarist Russia in 1801, many families abandoned their settlements and permanently inhabited the liberated villages in Lori. The founding families of the village are the Kalashyans, Muradyans, Zalinyans and Harutyunyans.

Geography and climate
Gargar is located 1400–1500 meters above sea level.  The geographic location of the village of Gargar is very advantageous, as the Yerevan-Tbilisi highway crosses through it.  Climate conditions are also very favorable. The village is surrounded with high mountains, thick forests and they provide 50% of the village with drinking water. It is because of the lack of proper water pipes that the village is not secured with 100% drinking water.  It is typically very cold in the winters, with mild temperatures in the summers.

Demographics

Agriculture
The village is rich with pastures and recently the villagers have also made use of the "pordzadasht", where people cultivate crops atypical to the surrounding territories such as broccoli, physalis, pattypan squash, etc.  Villagers mostly cultivate potatoes and wheat, and farmers mostly produce milk, honey, eggs and wool.

Education and services
The village has a secondary school which is located in the kindergarten building. The community also has cultural house, which was renovated in 2011. 
There is a fully functioning first aid clinic, which was built with the help of Red Cross in the early 1990s.

Tourism

Bed and breakfast
Being very close to the Stepanavan Dendropark, Gargar is an attractive tourist destination for local and foreign visitors. Currently, there are 7 bed and breakfast homes available in the village.

Pilgrimage sites in Gargar

Amenaprkich
While escaping from their enemies during a war that ravaged their lands in the 19th century, a group of villagers took shelter in a small hut.  Despite many attempts by the enemy to breach the hut, it stood intact.  As a result of their miraculous survival, the villagers created this pilgrimage site and named it "Amenaprkitch" which essentially translates to "Savior of all."  According to their folklore, every wish that you make here will come true.

Surp Nshan
According to their local history, "some pilgrims sat by the side of a road to rest while passing through this part of the village.  One night one of the pilgrims dreamt that light descended from the sky upon this very place. The pilgrims returned to the exact location and built a shrine here, naming it “Sur Nshan” which translates to "Holy Sign".

Surp Hovhannes Church
Sourp Hovhannes Church was built in 1905-1907; it was built by Greek and Armenian architects with the funds of the villagers. The church bell was brought from Tula, Russia and is still found in the church. Many typical religious rituals still take place in the church: Christmastide, Christenings, Weddings, and so on.

Prominent figures
Hrachya Ghaplanyan (Hrachya Ghaplanyan Drama Theatre in Yerevan is named after him)
Viktor Balayan

References

External links

World Gazetteer: Armenia – World-Gazetteer.com

Populated places in Lori Province